Mobissimo  is a travel metasearch engine website based in San Francisco, California. It allows consumers to compare prices on flights, hotels, and car rentals. The company offers country-specific websites in North America, Brazil, Mexico, France, Italy, Poland, Spain, Germany, the UK, India and Japan.

History
The site was founded in 2004 with $1 million of seed money from Benhamou Global Ventures, Cambrian Ventures and Index Ventures.

Recognition
 In 2010, the Chicago Tribune quoted it as one of the “3 Leading Search Engines” for travel.

 TechCrunch said it would “out execute” Kayak.com.

References

External links
 
 One Stop Shopping for That Dream Vacation The New York Times

Metasearch engines
Travel ticket search engines
Internet properties established in 2004
Companies based in San Francisco